Cormac McGinley is a former Gaelic footballer who played for the Errigal Ciarán club and the Tyrone county team. He was a member of Tyrone's 2003 All-Ireland and league winning panel, although he took no part in the final. McGinley played his club football alongside Tyrone's Peter Canavan, winning two Tyrone Senior Football Championships and the Ulster Senior Football Championship.

References

Year of birth missing (living people)
Living people
Errigal Ciarán Gaelic footballers
Tyrone inter-county Gaelic footballers